Christoph Ehlers (born 31 January 1958) is a German lawyer and entrepreneur. Ehlers is managing director and sole shareholder of Equicore Beteiligungs GmbH. He is co-founder of multiple technological companies (f.e. Biochip Technologies GmbH, GeneScan Europe AG, itm AG, Centogene AG, and together with Professor Lüder Gerken of Stiftung Ordnungspolitik – Centrum für Europäische Politik, a German economic thinktank, and of Freiburger Vermögensmanagement GmbH, a German portfolio management company. He is member of various management and supervisory boards, including Centogene AG in Rostock.

Professional career
Ehlers received his academic credentials between 1976 and 1982 from the University of Konstanz and passed both Legal State Examinations in the German State of Baden-Württemberg.  He received in 1982 an LL.M. in international law from the University of San Diego. In 1982, he joined Commerzbank AG, the second-largest German bank and moved quickly forward to the investment banking unit, from 1987 to 1992 he was promoted to become the personal assistant to the chairman of the board, Dr. Walter Seipp, and from 1992 until 1996 he headed the branches of Commerzbank in the southwestern part of Germany. In 1997, he founded Equicore Beteiligungs GmbH and co-founded Freiburger Vermögensmanagement GmbH in 1998. In June 2000, Ehlers was co-led the IPO on the German Neue Markt of GeneScan Europe AG, which was launched with an initial market capitalization of more 500 million than Euros.

In addition, he is member of the board of trustees of Stiftung Ordnungspolitik. He is member of the Young Leaders of Atlantikbrücke eV and of Global Bridges eV, both in Berlin.

References

External links
 Equicore Beteiligungs GmbH
 Freiburger Vermögensmanagement GmbH

1958 births
Living people